Souphanouvong University is a university in Luang Prabang, Laos.

History
Souphanouvong University (SU) is a university in Luang Prabang, the old capital of Laos and its fourth largest city. It is one of five national universities in the country. It was established in accordance with the Prime Minister Decree, No 169/PM, dated 4 November 2003, and inaugurated on the following day. The University is named after Prince Souphanouvong, who was the first President of the Democratic People's Republic of Laos.

According to the Prime Minister Decree on the Organization and Activities of Souphanouvong University, No 099/PM, dated 3 April 2009, SU is a public national educational and cultural institution under the Ministry of Education. The University carries out the educational functions of preparing specialists, researchers and multidisciplinary scientific scholars; organizing scientific research; protecting and promoting Lao’s unique national and multiethnic arts and culture; and delivering academic services to society.

Souphanouvong University has two campuses. The main campus, in Ban Donmay 9 km along 13th Northern Road, covers an area of 110 hectares. The SU Faculty of Education, the second campus, covers a land area of 2 hectares and is in Ban Nasang-Veuy, much closer to the city.

2018 the university helped to establish the first Confucius Institute in northern Laos (together with the Kunming University of Science and Technology).

Programmes and courses

Souphanouvong University currently runs 20 undergraduate bachelor's degrees, each of 4-year duration.

The Faculty of Education offers three degree programmes: Lao language and literacy, English, and mathematics.

The Faculty of Economics and Tourism has six programmes: economics, general business management, tourism management, IT business management, international business management, and finance and banking.

The Faculty of Agriculture and Forest Resources offers four programmes: plant science, animal science, forest resources, and food science and technology.

The Faculty of Engineering has three programmes: electrical engineering, computer engineering, and civil engineering.

The Faculty of Architecture offers two programmes: architecture and interior design.

The Faculty of Languages has two programmes and two centres: Lao language, general English language, Korean Language Centre and the Chinese Language Centre.

Administrative matters

Souphanouvong University is administered by nine offices: the offices of general administration, finance, accommodation and services, academic affairs, student affairs, organization and personnel, planning and international coordination, research and scientific services, and library and ICT.

The University recruits students who have graduated from upper secondary education (USE) with the certificate of Baccalaureate.

Classes are conducted in whole working days from Monday to Friday. Regular courses run from 0800 to 1600hrs.

Academic year begins on 16 October and ends 15 July. It has two semesters: first semester is 16 October to 15 February; second semester is 1 March to 15 July.
The University organizes supplement recovery courses for failed students in August.

The University budget is allocated by the Central Government of the Lao People's Democratic Republic. Additional budget comes from charged tuition fees, facility rentals, provincial and community contributions, and international aid.

There are some 400 salary staff and lecturers and the university accepts on average 800 new students each year.

International relations & cooperation

Souphanouvong University has established academic relations and cooperation with 33 universities and organizations in neighboring countries such as Vietnam, the People's Republic of China, Cambodia, Thailand and the Republic of Korea.

The main cooperation activities are focused on scholar and student exchanges, library book and computer supply, as well as co-organizing international seminars, workshops and meetings.

The University accepts volunteers and applications can be made through NGOs, government, and more recently through individual offers made directly to the University. In volunteering, people must have a tangible skill to offer. There is a constant need for English language support for academic staff, as well as helping students with English (especially pronunciation and diction). The University prefers longer term stays than those of a month, so an entire semester or full year is encouraged.

References

External links
Official Web site
 

Educational institutions established in 1996
Universities in Laos
National universities
Forestry education
Buildings and structures in Luang Prabang
1996 establishments in Laos